Theo Heimann (1 May 1911 – 19 August 1979) was a Swiss racing cyclist. He rode in the 1936 Tour de France.

References

External links
 

1911 births
1979 deaths
Swiss male cyclists
Tour de Suisse stage winners